Mohamed El-Gabbas (born january 1, 1988, in Port Said), also known as "Dodo" El Gabbas, is an Egyptian football forward who plays for Wadi Degla and the Egyptian national team.

Career
Mohamed El-Gabbas was playing for the youth ranks at Al-Masry at the age of 14. He then got noticed by a youth scout from Newcastle and he played alongside former West Ham striker Andy Carroll in the youth ranks at Newcastle. After playing for a year for Newcastle's youth team, El-Gabbas unfortunately could not obtain a work permit and therefore was not able to sign a professional contract with Newcastle. As a result, El-Gabbas returned to his former Egyptian club Al-Masry.

After two seasons with Al-Masry, El-Gabbas shone like a star scoring many goals in Egyptian league and cup competitions, leading to both Egyptian giants Al-Ahly and Zamalek looking to obtain his signature. However, he decided to sign for Belgian Second Division side Lierse S.K. in 2009. There he played comfortably alongside his Egyptian teammates Ahmed Samir, Sherif El Baily and Mohamed Abdel Wahed. He consistently played in a very successful Lierse season as they got promoted to the Belgian Pro League in 2010. As the years went on, El-Gabbas was always one of the first choice strikers along with Wesley Sonck and Soufiane Bidaoui. His impressive goal-scoring ability drew the attention of Egypt national team coaches Hassan Shehata and Bob Bradley and also some other clubs from bigger leagues in Europe. In an interview with El-Gabbas on Melody Sport, El-Gabbas stated that he is enjoying himself at Lierse and wouldn't mind staying and helping the team but he "would like to move to a bigger league in Europe in the near future." El-Gabbas later stated that he has offers from French and Dutch teams and he would like to move "at the end of the 2012 season or in the 2013 season."

El Gabbas left Lierse S.K. at the end of 2012–13 Belgian Pro League. He signed with League One side Swindon Town.

He left Swindon Town for limited playing time and signed Ligue 2 team Arles for six months.

He returned to Egypt in September 2014 after his short stints with French team Arles the past season. He signed with Cairo-based club Wadi Degla, before returning to Belgium for a second spell.

International career
He was named to the Egypt squad for a 2010 FIFA World Cup qualifying match against Rwanda and Zambia. El-Gabbas was called to the national team more with current Egypt team coach Bob Bradley then before-coach Hassan Shehata. He has taken part in numerous friendlies and in World Cup and African Cup qualifiers.
His last appearance was against Brasil in Doha. He did not appear for the national team after then.

References

1988 births
Living people
Association football forwards
Egyptian expatriate footballers
Egyptian footballers
Al Masry SC players
Lierse S.K. players
Swindon Town F.C. players
AC Arlésien players
Wadi Degla SC players
Challenger Pro League players
Belgian Pro League players
Expatriate footballers in Belgium
People from Port Said
Sportspeople from Port Said